Stomonaxellus is a genus of beetles in the family Carabidae, containing the following species:

 Stomonaxellus ceylanensis (Straneo, 1938)
 Stomonaxellus filicornis Tschitscherine, 1901

References

Pterostichinae